Razia Sajjad Zaheer (15 October 1918, Ajmer – 18 December 1979, Delhi) was an Indian writer in the Urdu language, a translator, and a prominent member of the Progressive Writers Association. She won the Uttar Pradesh Sahitya Akademi Award as well as the Soviet Land Nehru Award.

Early life
Razia Dilshad was born in Ajmer, Rajasthan on 15 October 1918 in an academic family. Her father was the principal of Ajmer Islamia College. She received an undergraduate degree in Ajmer.

She married Sajjad Zaheer, a poet and communist activist, when she was 20. He was one of the founders of the Progressive Writers Association (PWA), and was not interested in pursuing a career in law that he had trained for. Shortly after their marriage, he was arrested by the British for his revolutionary activities and imprisoned for two years.

Razia obtained a postgraduate degree from Allahabad University. In the 1940s, Razia and her husband were in Bombay, where they were active in the cultural sphere, organising weekly PWA soirees. She acknowledged the influence of the PWA in radicalising her politics, and was among the activist women who were beginning to question "Gandhian ideologies of women's nature and place."

By 1948, Razia had four daughters, and her husband was in Pakistan at the behest of the Communist Party of India, which had supported the Partition of India. She moved to Lucknow with her daughters.

Career
Razia had been contributing short stories to journals like Phool, Tehzib-e-Nisvaan and Ismat since her childhood. In Lucknow, Razia began to teach, write and translate in order to earn a living. She translated about 40 books into Urdu. Her translation of Bertold Brecht's Life of Galileo to Urdu was called powerful. She translated Siyaram Sharan Gupta's Nari (published as Aurat (Woman) by Sahitya Akademi), and Mulk Raj Anand's Seven Years (Saat Saal, 1962).

In 1953, her novella Sar-e-Sham was published, Kante (Thorns, a novel) was released in 1954, while Suman (another novel) came out in 1964. She edited and published her husband's letters to her from prison, Nuqush-e-Zindan (1954). 

She worked on a novel on the poet Majaz Lucknowi, which remained unfinished. Along with her literary endeavours, she also edited and copied her husband's writings. 

Her short stories have been characterised as having a socialistic purpose. For example, in Neech (Lowborn) she explored class differences between a privileged woman and a fruit-seller, and the prejudices the former has to set aside to obtain strength from the latter. Moreover, given the revolutionary ideology of the PWA, her works - as those of her colleagues in the group - explored gender relations and women's oppression by men and other women, the development of a modernist identity among women, as well as the more deleterious effects of poverty and ostracism on marginalised women.

Zard Gulab (The Yellow Rose, 1981) and Allah De Banda Le (God gives, Man takes, 1984) were two of her short story collections published posthumously.

Later life
Razia's husband was in prison in Pakistan until 1956, whereupon he returned to India and joined his family in Lucknow. In 1964, they moved to Delhi. Sajjad died in USSR in 1973.

Razia Sajjad Zaheer died in Delhi on 18 December 1979.

Bibliography
The literary work of Razia Sajjad Zaheer include:
 Sar-e-Sham (1953)
 Kaante (1954)
 Suman (1963)
 
 Zard Gulaab (1981)
 Allah De Banda Le (1984)
 Nehru ka Bhateeja (1954)
 Sultan Zainul Abidin Budshah

Awards and honours
 Soviet Land Nehru Award (1966).
 Uttar Pradesh Sahitya Akademi Award (1972).

References

Bibliography

People from Ajmer
20th-century Indian Muslims
Urdu-language writers from India
University of Allahabad alumni
1918 births
1979 deaths
Indian feminist writers
20th-century Urdu-language writers
Indian women short story writers
Translators to Urdu
20th-century translators
Communist Party of India politicians from Rajasthan
Female politicians of the Communist Party of India